An Byong-jun (born 22 May 1990) is a North Korean footballer who plays as a forward for K League 1 side Suwon Samsung Bluewings.

Career statistics

Club
As of 6 November 2021.

International

References

External links

1990 births
Living people
Chuo University alumni
Association football people from Tokyo Metropolis
People from Kokubunji, Tokyo
North Korean footballers
Association football forwards
North Korea international footballers
J1 League players
J2 League players
K League 2 players
K League 1 players
Kawasaki Frontale players
JEF United Chiba players
Zweigen Kanazawa players
Roasso Kumamoto players
Suwon FC players
Busan IPark players
Suwon Samsung Bluewings players
North Korean expatriate footballers
Expatriate footballers in South Korea
K League 2 Most Valuable Player Award winners